Amedia is a genus of wood midges in the family Cecidomyiidae. The only described species - Amedia floridana - is only known from Florida. The genus was established by Mathias Jaschhof in 1997.

References

Cecidomyiidae genera

Insects described in 1997
Taxa named by Mathias Jaschhof
Diptera of North America
Monotypic Diptera genera